Jete or Jeté may refer to:

 Jete, Granada, a municipality of Spain
 Jeté (dance), a leap in ballet
 Grand jeté
 Temelín Nuclear Power Station (Jaderná elektrárna Temelín), Czech Republic
 Kornbread Jeté, American drag queen

See also
La Jetée